Elections to Reading Borough Council took place on Thursday 5 May 2011.

There were 15 seats up for election, one third of the council. The election meant that the council continued to have no overall control but a Labour led minority administration replaced the previous Conservative Liberal Democrat coalition. The posts of leader of the council and mayor were filled at a meeting of the council on 25 May 2011. Labour member Deborah Edwards was elected mayor on the casting vote of outgoing mayor, Gul Khan.  Councillor Edwards then used her casting vote in favour of the new Leader of the council, Jo Lovelock.  The two Green Party councillors abstained in both votes.

After the election, the composition of the council was:

Election result

Ward results

Notes

References

2011 English local elections
2011
2010s in Berkshire